Leslie Lloyd Odom Jr. (born August 6, 1981) is an American actor and singer. He made his acting debut on Broadway in 1998 and first gained recognition for his portrayal of Aaron Burr in the musical Hamilton, which earned him a Tony Award for Best Actor in a Musical and a Grammy Award for Best Musical Theater Album in the same year. His performance was captured in the Disney+ live stage recording of Hamilton which earned him a Primetime Emmy Award for Outstanding Actor in a Leading Role in a Limited Series or Movie nomination. 

Odom is also known for his roles in the television series Smash (2012–2013) and Person of Interest (2013–2014), as well as the films Red Tails (2012), Murder on the Orient Express (2017), Harriet (2019), The Many Saints of Newark (2021), and Glass Onion (2022). For his role   as singer Sam Cooke in One Night in Miami... (2020) he earned nominations for the Academy Award, BAFTA Award, Screen Actors Guild Award, and Golden Globe Award for Best Supporting Actor. He was also nominated for the Oscar and Golden Globe for writing the film's original song "Speak Now".

Odom currently voices the character of Owen Tillerman in the Apple TV+ animated musical-comedy series Central Park, for which he was nominated for an Primetime Emmy Award in 2020. Odom has released four albums, Leslie Odom Jr. (2014), Simply Christmas (2016), Mr. (2019), and The Christmas Album (2020). He released his autobiography Failing Up in 2018.

Early life and education 
Odom was born in Queens, New York City. His father Leslie Lloyd Odom worked in sales. One of his maternal great-grandfathers was from South Africa, and a maternal great-great-grandfather was from Bridgetown, Barbados. Odom's family moved to the East Oak Lane section of Philadelphia, where he grew up. He attended Julia R. Masterman School for middle school and Philadelphia High School for Creative and Performing Arts for high school. Odom and his family attended Canaan Baptist Church in the Germantown section of Philadelphia, where he sang solos in the church choir.

He earned a degree with honors at Carnegie Mellon University in Pittsburgh, Pennsylvania, and then moved to Los Angeles in the summer of 2003.

Career

Acting career

Theater 
Odom attended the New Freedom Theatre in Philadelphia, where he studied theater and performed in musicals. He then went on to study musical theater in college. At the age of 17, he made his Broadway debut as Paul in Rent. In 2001, he appeared in the ensemble of the one-night Broadway concert version of Dreamgirls.

He spent much of his time doing theater in Los Angeles, including in 2010 with Leap of Faith, which moved to Broadway in 2012, with him starring as Isaiah Sturdevant. When the show closed shortly afterward, he relocated to New York City.

After starring Off-Broadway in Venice and in Witness Uganda (later retitled Invisible Thread) at A.R.T. and in workshops, Odom worked with Lin-Manuel Miranda in the Encores! Off-Center production of Tick, Tick... Boom!, playing Michael. Odom also played Nat King Cole in the 2015 one-night Actors Fund of America benefit concert of Bombshell.

Odom was nominated for a 2015 Drama Desk Award for Outstanding Featured Actor in a Musical for the role of Aaron Burr in the off-Broadway production of Hamilton at The Public Theater. He continued in the same role at the Richard Rodgers Theatre after the show transferred to Broadway later that year. He also won a 2016 Grammy Award for the cast album, and won the Tony Award for Best Actor in a Musical.

Odom's final appearance in the role of Aaron Burr in Hamilton occurred on July 9, 2016.

Television 
He has made guest appearances on several shows including Gilmore Girls, Grey's Anatomy, Supernatural, and The Good Wife. Odom had a recurring role on CSI: Miami, appearing as Joseph Kayle in nine episodes between 2003 and 2006.

He followed with a recurring role on Vanished, appearing in 10 episodes as Maliko Christo. From 2006 to 2007, he held a recurring role as Freddy on Big Day, appearing on nine episodes prior to its cancellation. He also had a supporting role in the TV movie Poe in 2011.

In the musical television series Smash, Odom had a recurring role as Sam Strickland in 2012, and was promoted to a starring role for the show's final season in 2013.

In late 2013, Odom was offered the leading role of Lucas Newsome on State of Affairs. He accepted the role, but ended up backing out to take the part of Aaron Burr in the workshops of the musical Hamilton.

In 2013 and 2014, he had a recurring role on Person of Interest as Peter Collier, appearing in eight episodes. He also played Reverend Curtis Scott in seven episodes of Law & Order: Special Victims Unit between 2013 and 2015.

Beginning on May 19, 2016, Odom hosted the Broadway.com web series Aaron Burr, Sir: Backstage at Hamilton with Leslie Odom Jr., with a new episode being uploaded every Thursday for eight weeks. Odom was also set to play Jimmy Jam in a 2017 miniseries about New Edition, but ended up leaving the project.

In 2020, Odom starred and executive produced the four-part, television miniseries Love in the Time of Corona opposite his wife Nicolette Robinson. Love in the Time of Corona follows four interwoven stories about the hopeful search for love and connection during the quarantine as a result of the COVID-19 pandemic. Production began virtually on June 29, 2020, in Los Angeles using remote technologies. The limited series premiered on Freeform on August 22, 2020.

Odom currently voices the character of Owen Tillerman in the Apple TV+ animated musical-comedy series Central Park, for which he was nominated for Outstanding Character Voice-Over Performance at the 2020 Primetime Emmy Awards. He will also guest star on the Disney+ The Proud Family continuation The Proud Family: Louder and Prouder in its second season as Kwame.

In 2016, Odom was also featured in a commercial for Nationwide Insurance.

On February 4, 2018, Odom sang "America the Beautiful" during the NBC broadcast of Super Bowl LII.

Film 
Odom has appeared in short films, and had a supporting role as Walter Hall in the 2012 war film Red Tails.

He played Dr. Arbuthnot in Kenneth Branagh's 2017 adaptation of Murder on the Orient Express. He also starred as abolitionist William Still in the 2019 film Harriet, about abolitionist Harriet Tubman. In 2019, Odom starred in Only, a post-apocalyptic romance alongside Freida Pinto.

In 2021, Odom starred as Ebo in musical film Music, which was co-written and directed by Australian singer-songwriter Sia. It was released in February 2021.

In 2020, Odom was cast as soul singer Sam Cooke in the Regina King–directed film adaptation of One Night in Miami..., which was released in theaters and Amazon Prime on January 15, 2021. Odom received rave reviews from critics for his portrayal of Cooke and has since earned Academy Award, Golden Globe, and SAG Award nominations including for the Best Supporting Actor and an additional nomination for Outstanding Performance by a Cast in a Motion Picture. With Sam Ashworth as co-writer, Odom co-wrote and performed "Speak Now", which also received a nomination for Best Original Song at the 78th Golden Globe Awards to be held on February 28, 2021. "Speak Now" is played during the end credits of One Night in Miami.

In May 2021, Odom was cast in the Glass Onion: A Knives Out Mystery, the sequel to Rian Johnson's Knives Out starring Daniel Craig as Benoit Blanc. In July 2021, Odom was cast for the upcoming, as yet untitled sequel film to William Friedkin's The Exorcist, with Ellen Burstyn reprising her role as Chris MacNeil.

Recording career 
In 2014, Odom self-released his debut album as a jazz singer, Leslie Odom Jr. on CD and SoundCloud, and promoted the album with several concerts at The Public Theater. In February 2016, he released a version of Selena Gomez's "Good For You" featuring his Hamilton castmate Daveed Diggs.

Odom was signed to a four-album deal with S-Curve Records in 2016. He and producer Steve Greenberg narrowed down 200 potential tunes to ten tracks, and Odom recorded an updated and improved version of Leslie Odom Jr. during days off and afternoons before Broadway performances, in order to release the album before Odom left Hamilton. Released in June 2016, the album charted at No. 1 on Billboard Jazz and No. 147 on Billboard 200.

On November 11, 2016, Odom released his second album, Simply Christmas, which featured jazz interpretations of Christmas standards. A deluxe edition of the album was released in October 2017, with four additional songs. Simply Christmas hit #1 on iTunes and the Billboard Jazz charts, reaching No. 4 on the Billboard Holiday chart and No. 31 on the Billboard Top 200 chart.

Odom released his third album and first of original material, Mr, in November 2019, and in October 2020, he debuted a new version of the album's standout song "Cold", featuring Sia.

His critically acclaimed second holiday album, The Christmas Album, was released in November 2020. The Christmas Album is Odom's fourth studio album.

Odom tours to promote his albums, performing concerts backed by a jazz quintet that includes a drummer, percussionist, bassist, guitarist and a pianist who is also Odom's musical director.

In December 2017, Odom returned to the New York City stage in a solo concert at Jazz at Lincoln Center. The cabaret-style performance was crafted around signature songs and music that shaped this artist's journey, all performed with a world-class band in front of a live audience. The show was filmed for broadcast as an hour-long PBS special as part of the 17-time Emmy Award-winning series, Live from Lincoln Center, and premiered in April 2018.

Writing 
In June 2017, it was announced that Odom had a book deal for Failing Up: How to Take Risks, Aim Higher, and Never Stop Learning, which he was writing with the intention to inspire younger readers. The book,  by an imprint of Macmillan in March 2018, "outlines the setbacks and rejections that preceded his success." Odom modeled his writing on the style of a commencement speech, exploring what he had learned throughout his life and the importance of pursuing passions.

Personal life 

Odom has been married to actress Nicolette Kloe Robinson since December 1, 2012. Their daughter, Lucille Ruby, was born on April 23, 2017. Their son, Able Phineas, was born on March 25, 2021.

The couple met in 2008 while Robinson was a student at UCLA and auditioned for Once on This Island in Los Angeles. When she replaced a cast member who left unexpectedly, assistant director Odom became responsible for bringing her quickly up to speed, and a romantic relationship ensued. Robinson has since appeared in the off-Broadway musical Invisible Thread (2015) and the television series The Affair, and played the lead role in the Broadway musical Waitress from September 4 through December 9, 2018.

Filmography

Film

Television

Theatre 

Workshops
 Witness Uganda (later retitled Invisible Thread), 2010

Discography

Studio albums

Soundtrack albums 
 Leap of Faith: The Musical (Original Broadway Cast Recording) (December 4, 2012)
 Venice (Original Cast Recording) (September 23, 2014)
 Hamilton (Original Broadway Cast Recording) (September 25, 2015)
 One Night In Miami (January 15, 2021) The soundtrack features the Original Song from the film, "Speak Now."

Singles

Other appearances

Awards and nominations 

In 2019, Odom was conferred an honorary Doctor of Fine Arts by his alma mater, Carnegie Mellon University, at its 122nd Commencement, where Odom was also the keynote speaker.

See also 
 List of actors with Academy Award nominations
 List of black Academy Award winners and nominees

References

External links 
 
 
 
 
 
 
 
 
 

1981 births
Living people
African-American male actors
African-American male singers
21st-century American male actors
American male singers
American baritones
American male musical theatre actors
American male stage actors
American male television actors
American male voice actors
Audiobook narrators
Tony Award winners
Grammy Award winners
Carnegie Mellon University College of Fine Arts alumni
People from Queens, New York
Male actors from New York City
Philadelphia High School for the Creative and Performing Arts alumni